Facundo Zamarián (born 25 December 1995) is an Argentinian professional footballer of Armenian descent who plays for Deportivo La Merced. In 2016, he was played for Belshina Bobruisk.

Born in Salta, Zamarian began playing football in the Boca Juniors youth system. He never played for the senior side, and instead spent two seasons with his hometown club Central Norte. He also had a spell in Belarus with FC Belshina Bobruisk.

References

External links 
 
 Profile at pressball.by

1995 births
Living people
Argentine footballers
Argentine expatriate footballers
Expatriate footballers in Belarus
Boca Juniors footballers
FC Belshina Bobruisk players
Central Norte players
Association football midfielders
People from Salta
Sportspeople from Salta Province